Mukut Parbat or Mukut Parvat (Hindi: मुकुट पर्वत) is a mountain in Uttarakhand India, and the 20th highest located entirely within India. Nanda Devi, is the highest mountain in this category. Mukut Parbat 96th highest peak in the world. It falls under Kamet Zaskar Range.

Climbing history

Mukut Parbat  was first climbed in 1951 by a team from New Zealand through its sharp and steep western ridge. Cotter, Pasang Dawa Lama and Riddiford reached its summit from the Dakhini Chamrao glacier which joins the Saraswati from the east. Mukut Parbat lies in the Zaskar Range which does not receive the heavy monsoon.

Neighboring and subsidiary peaks
Mukut Parbat is surrounded by three principal neighboring or subsidiary peaks:
 Abi Gamin, 7,355 m (24,130 ft), prominence = 217 m 
 Kamet, 7,756 m (24,130 ft), prominence = 2825 m 
Chamrao Parbat 6,910 m (22178 ft)

Glaciers and rivers
The West (Paschimi) Kamet Glacier. The branches of the West Kamet Glacier head on the western slopes of Kamet, Abi Gamin, and Mukut Parbat and Dakhini Chamrao glacier

See also
 List of mountain peaks of Uttarakhand

References

Mountains of Uttarakhand
Geography of Chamoli district
Seven-thousanders of the Himalayas